United States Committee of the International Council on Monuments and Sites (US/ICOMOS) is one of numerous national subsidiary committees of ICOMOS, forming a worldwide alliance for the study and conservation of historic buildings, districts, and sites. It is the focus of international cultural resources exchange in the United States, working to share preservation information and expertise worldwide. It also highlights and interprets the unique American preservation system: the partnership between private organizations and federal, state, and local governments, and the cooperation between the academic community, professionals and civic volunteers.

US/ICOMOS is one of the largest national committees of ICOMOS, comprising over 1,000 members in the United States and abroad. As the only professional preservation organization with a global focus in the United States, US/ICOMOS serves as the principle gateway for the participation of preservation professionals in worldwide heritage conservation. The organization guides and promotes activities through an extensive membership network of preservation professionals, institutions, and organizations, including specialized scientific committees.  US/ICOMOS also organizes an annual international scientific symposium, an International Intern Exchange Program, and occasional special training courses and workshops.

See also
 
 Historic Preservation
 ICOMOS
 List of World Heritage Sites in the Americas

External links
 ICOMOS Official Site
 US/ICOMOS Official Site

Heritage organizations
Archaeological organizations
Historic preservation organizations in the United States
Cultural heritage of the United States
Historic preservation